Viola ocellata is a species of violet known by the common names pinto violet, two-eyed violet, and western heart's ease. It is native to southern Oregon and northern and central California, where it occurs in the coastal foothills and mountain ranges. It sometimes grows in serpentine soils and in quicksilver mines.

Description
The leaves have heart-shaped or roughly lance-shaped blades borne on petioles a few centimeters long. A solitary flower is borne on a long, upright stem. It has five white petals with yellow bases, the lowest three veined with purple and the two lateral ones with purple eyespots. The inside of the flower has long hairs. The outer surfaces, at least of the two upper petals, is usually stained dark red or purple. The rootstocks are often long and stolon-like.

The species is a host plant of the butterfly Boloria epithore.

References

External links

 Jepson Manual Treatment
 Photo gallery

ocellata
Flora of California
Flora of Oregon
Taxa named by Asa Gray
Taxa named by John Torrey
Flora without expected TNC conservation status